, commonly known as , is a Japanese film director and one of Japan's most popular comedians and TV hosts. He is one half of the comedy duo Downtown alongside Masatoshi Hamada. Like Hamada, Matsumoto was born and raised in Amagasaki, Hyōgo Prefecture.

Matsumoto has directed several movies beginning in 2007 with Big Man Japan, in several of which he also starred as the main character. He currently hosts Documental on Amazon Prime.

Matsumoto is also the subject of the "Screaming Japanese Man" (a.k.a. "Screaming Asian Man") meme, originally taken from a segment of the variety show Gaki no Tsukai.

Early life
Matsumoto was born in Amagasaki, Hyōgo, to a poor family. He has one older sister and one older brother, an established folk guitarist who released an autobiographical book titled . He has expressed his feelings about growing up in a poor household in a poem titled  which Hamada turned into a song in 2004. In his poem, he wrote how laughter was the only way to get through those times. He credits his poverty for giving him a good imagination and sense of play, as it forced him to invent his own games to entertain himself.

His favorite manga as a child was Tensai Bakabon by Fujio Akatsuka. He aspired to become a manga artist.

He attended Ushio Elementary School, where he met Masatoshi Hamada. He graduated from Amagasaki Technical High School in 1982.  Although he secured a job at a printing office, to pursue his dream of becoming a comedian, he was invited by Hamada in 1982 to enter  Yoshimoto Kōgyō. Together, they became Downtown, and made their major debut in 1983.

Personal life

Bachelorhood
Matsumoto remained single with no history of marriage for years after his comedy partner, Hamada, was married with children. He stated that he was not into romance, finding acts such as sharing a bed or bathing with someone else bothersome and unnecessary.

It was revealed in July 2008 that Matsumoto was dating then 25-year-old tarento Ihara Rin. In the evening of May 17, 2009, it was announced that Matsumoto's official bachelorhood had ended with a secret marriage ceremony between himself and the aforementioned Ihara. Ihara, a former weather announcer for the Japanese news program "ズームイン!! Super" (Zoom In!! Super) is nineteen years Matsumoto's junior, and apparently became pregnant by Matsumoto, prompting the marriage. The announcement of the marriage came via fax by Matsumoto's managing organization to several media outlets, including a personal message by Matsumoto himself: "My partner will quit her job and is currently pregnant. As this is a delicate time, I would like this to be dealt with as gently as possible. It would be best to hold a press conference, however I'm too embarrassed to, so I won't."

On October 6, 2009, Matsumoto and Ihara Rin became parents to a daughter. At the time, Matsumoto was in South Korea for the screening of the film "Symbol."

Interests
Matsumoto's hobbies include driving, billiards, and video games.

As an admirer of Vincent van Gogh, he has gone to Amsterdam to visit The Van Gogh Museum. Another figure he respects is the late comedian, Kanbi Fujiyama.

He enjoys tokusatsu shows and owns DVD box sets of series such as Kamen Rider and Giant Robo. He has parodied tokusatsu a number of times on his previous show, Downtown no Gottsu Ee Kanji (with characters such as the Go-Renjai, Miracle Ace and Aho Aho Man), and in his directorial film debut, Dainipponjin.

Health
He has demonstrated good physical fitness on Gaki no Tsukai. He defeated his comedy partner Hamada in a high jump competition by clearing 1.40m on the first try. In 1999, he outran Hamada, Hōsei Yamasaki and both members of Cocorico in a 100-meter race (he ran the entire length while the other four ran a quarter of the length each in the form of a relay race). Three years later, he performed notably better than them in a long jump competition.

Although he claims to have no interest in sports, he has occasionally dabbled in boxing as he is friends with former world boxing champion Joichiro Tatsuyoshi.

Once a heavy cigarette smoker, he quit in 2003.

On June 28, 2010, Yoshimoto Kogyo announced that Matsumoto would not be performing on any shows for two months due to an injury on his left hip, which required surgery. For two episodes, the remaining Gaki no Tsukai cast members discussed his condition, with Matsumoto returning to hosting on August 31, 2010. In subsequent segments of the show requiring rigorous physical activities, such as the annual New Year's Eve 24-Hour Batsu Games of recent years, he is exempted and instead given idle or captive roles, due to his previous injury.

During the 2012 Gaki no Tsukai batsu game involving the group becoming airline assistants, Matsumoto revealed he had suffered a stress fracture preparing for said batsu game, and despite doctor's orders, he still participated in the batsu game.

List of works

Films
Comic shorts:
Tōzu (頭頭) (1993)
Sundome Kaikyō (寸止め海峡) (1995)
Visualbum Vol. Apple – Promise (ビジュアルバム Vol. リンゴ – 約束) (1998)
Visualbum Vol. Banana – Kindness (ビジュアルバム Vol. バナナ – 親切) (1998)
Visualbum Vol. Grape – Relief (ビジュアルバム Vol. ブドウ – 安心) (1999)
Sasuke (佐助) (2001)
Zassā (ザッサー) (2006)
Full-length movies:
Big Man Japan (2007)
Symbol (2009)
Saya Zamurai (2011)
R100 (2013)
Violence Voyager (2019), narrator

Television and radio
Hitori gottsu (一人ごっつ) (1996–1997)
Densetsu no kyōshi (伝説の教師) (2000)
Ashita ga aru sa (明日があるさ) (2001)
Hōsō-shitsu (放送室) (Since 2001)
Hitoshi Matsumoto no suberanai hanashi (人志松本のすべらない話) (Since 2004)
Ippon Grand Prix (IPPONグランプリ) (Since 2009)
Matsumoto Hitoshi no Konto (MHK) (松本人志のコント) (2010)
Hitoshi Matsumoto Presents Documental (Since 2016)

Books
Isho (遺書) (1994) 
Matsumoto (松本) (1995) 
Matsumoto Hitoshi Ai (松本人志 愛) (1998) 
Matsumoto Bōzu (松本坊主) (1999) 
Zukan (図鑑) (2000) 
Matsumoto Cinema Bōzu (松本シネマ坊主) (2002) 
Matsumoto Saiban (松本裁判) (2002) 
Teihon Hitorigottsu (定本一人ごっつ) 
Sukika, Kiraika – Matsumoto Hitoshi no Nigenron (好きか、嫌いか – 松本人志の二元論) (2004) 
Sukika, Kiraika 2 – Matsumoto Hitoshi no Saishuu Sanban (好きか、嫌いか2 – 松本人志の最終裁判) (2005) 
Cinema Bōzu 2 (シネマ坊主2) (2005) 
Cinema Bōzu 3 (シネマ坊主3) (2008) 
Matsumoto Hitoshi No Ikari Akaban (松本人志の怒り 赤版) (2008) 
Matsumoto Hitoshi No Ikari Aoban (松本人志の怒り 青版) (2008)

External links
Downtown no Gaki no Tsukai ya Arahende!! (Nippon TV) official site
Lincoln (TBS TV) official site
Hey! Hey! Hey! Music Champ (Fuji TV) official site
Dai-Nipponjin review at SaruDama.com

Hitoshi Matsumoto discography at Discogs.

Notes and references

1963 births
Living people
Japanese comedians
Japanese television personalities
People from Amagasaki